The Royal Tank Regiment (RTR) is the oldest tank unit in the world, being formed by the British Army in 1916 during the First World War. Today, it is the armoured regiment of the British Army's 12th Armoured Infantry Brigade. Formerly known as the Tank Corps and the Royal Tank Corps, it is part of the Royal Armoured Corps.

History

First World War

The formation of the Royal Tank Regiment followed the invention of the tank. Tanks were first used at the Battle of Flers–Courcelette in September 1916 during the Battle of the Somme in the First World War. They were at first considered artillery, and crews received artillery pay. At that time the six tank companies were grouped as the Heavy Section of the Machine Gun Corps (MGC). In November 1916 the eight companies then in existence were each expanded to form battalions (still identified by the letters A to H) and designated the  Heavy Branch MGC; another seven battalions, I to O, were formed by January 1918, when all the battalions were changed to numbered units. On 28 July 1917, the Heavy Branch was separated from the rest of the Corps by Royal Warrant and given official status as the Tank Corps. The formation of new battalions continued and, by December 1918, 26 had been created though only 25 battalions were equipped with tanks, as the 17th had converted to armoured cars in April 1918. The first commander of the Tank Corps was Hugh Elles. The Corps saw much action at the Battle of Cambrai in November 1917.

Interwar period
After the war, the Tank Corps was trimmed down to a central depot and four battalions: the 2nd, 3rd, 4th and 5th battalions. On 18 October 1923, it was officially given the title Royal making it the Royal Tank Corps (RTC) by Colonel-in-Chief King George V. It was at this time that the motto, "Fear Naught", the black beret, and the unit badge were adopted. In 1933, the 6th Battalion, RTC was formed in Egypt by combining the personnel of the 3rd and 5th Regular Army Armoured Car Companies. In 1934, the 1st (Light) Battalion, RTC was formed in England with personnel drawn from the 2nd, 3rd & 5th Battalions. With the preparations for war in the late 1930s, two more Regular Army battalions were formed: the 7th in 1937 and the 8th in 1938. In the latter half of 1938, six TA infantry battalions were converted to tank battalions; with a further six created in 1939 following the "duplication" of the TA.

During the early 1920s, the Tank Corps was augmented by 20 armoured car companies: twelve Regular Army, created using MGC elements; and eight Territorial Army (TA) created by the reduction and conversion of Yeomanry regiments. Eight of the Regular Army companies were later converted into independent light tank companies; all twelve companies had been disbanded by the outbreak of the Second World War.

On 4 April 1939, the Royal Tank Corps was renamed the Royal Tank Regiment and became a wing of the newly created Royal Armoured Corps. The eight Yeomanry Armoured Car Companies of the RTR were activated and transferred to the Royal Armoured Corps. Before the Second World War, Royal Tank Corps recruits were required to be at least 5 feet 4 inches tall. They initially enlisted for six years with the colours and a further six years with the reserve. They trained at the Royal Tank Corps Depot at Bovington Camp, Dorset for about eight months.

Second World War

At the outbreak of war, the regiment consisted of 20 battalions, 8 regular and 12 territorial.

 Regular Army
Heavy Armoured Brigade (Egypt): 1st RTR and 6th RTR
1st Heavy Armoured Brigade: 2nd RTR, 3rd RTR and 5th RTR
1st Army Tank Brigade: 4th RTR, 7th RTR and 8th RTR
 Territorial Army
21st Army Tank Brigade: 42nd RTR, 44th RTR and 48th RTR
23rd Army Tank Brigade: 40th RTR, 46th RTR and 50th RTR
24th Army Tank Brigade: 41st RTR, 45th RTR and 47th RTR
25th Army Tank Brigade: 43rd RTR, 49th RTR and 51st RTR

During the course of the war, four "hostilities-only" battalions were formed: the 9th, 10th, 11th and 12th. 11 RTR formed part of 79th Armoured Division (a specialist group operating vehicles known as "Hobart's Funnies"), initially equipped with "Canal Defence Light" tanks, it converted to "Buffalo" (the British service name for the US Landing Vehicle Tracked) not long after D-Day and participated in the assault crossing of the Rhine. Prime Minister Winston Churchill was ferried across the Rhine in a Buffalo from 'C' Squadron, 11RTR.

The Regiment's numerous units took part in countless battles in the Second World War, including the Battle of Dunkirk, El Alamein, Italian Campaign, Burma Campaign and D-Day landings of 6 June 1944. Field Marshal Sir Bernard Law Montgomery would frequently wear the regiment's beret, with his Field Marshal's badge sewn on next to the regimental cap badge, as it was more practical whilst travelling on a tank than either a formal peaked hat or the Australian slouch hat he previously wore.

Post-war period
After service in the Korean War, the RTR was reduced through various amalgamations, firstly, in 1959–60:
 3 RTR and 6 RTR amalgamated as 3 RTR
 4 RTR and 7 RTR amalgamated as 4 RTR
 5 RTR and 8 RTR amalgamated as 5 RTR

In 1969, 5RTR was disbanded, while, in 1992 under Options for Change, 4RTR amalgamated with 1RTR, and 3RTR amalgamated with 2RTR.

The Royal Tank Regiment continued to see action including missions in Bosnia and Herzegovina and Kosovo. Elements of 1RTR were deployed to Afghanistan in 2002 and both regiments were involved in the invasion of Iraq, with the 2RTR battlegroup involved in taking Basra. Both regiments continued deployments to Iraq and Afghanistan, with the final tour to Afghanistan taking place in 2013.

On 2 August 2014, 1RTR and 2RTR amalgamated at Bulford, and for the first time in its history the Royal Tank Regiment became a "Single Battalion" Regiment. The new regiment is titled the Royal Tank Regiment.

Current status
The regiment is equipped with Challenger 2 tanks and based at Tidworth coming under 12th Armoured Infantry Brigade following the Army 2020 refine. Unlike the other Type 56 Challenger 2 Regiments, the RTR also has an CBRN reconnaissance squadron operating the Fuchs reconnaissance vehicle which forms part of 28 Engineer Regiment. Thus the regiment comprises six squadrons:

Ajax – Challenger 2 armoured squadron
Badger – Challenger 2 armoured squadron
Cyclops – Challenger 2 armoured squadron
Dreadnaught – Challenger 2 armoured squadron
Egypt – Headquarters, Command, and Reconnaissance squadron
Falcon – CBRN reconnaissance squadron (under 28 Engineer Regiment)

Regimental museum
The Tank Museum, the museum of the Royal Tank Regiment, is at Bovington Camp in Dorset.

Battle honours

The battle honours are:

The Great War
Somme 1916 '18, Arras 1917 '18, Messines 1917, Ypres 1917, Cambrai 1917, St. Quentin 1918, Villers-Bretonneux, Amiens, Bapaume 1918, Hindenburg Line, Épéhy, Selle, France and Flanders 1916–18, Gaza

The Second World War
North-West Europe 1940
Arras Counter Attack, Calais 1940, St. Omer-La Bassée, Somme
North Africa 1940–43
Sidi Barrani, Beda Fomm, Sidi Suleiman, Tobruk 1941, Sidi Rezegh 1941, Belhamed, Gazala, Cauldron, Knightsbridge, Defence of Alamein Line, Alam el Halfa, El Alamein, Mareth, Akarit, Fondouk, El Kourzia, Medjez Plain, Tunis
Sicily 1943
Primosole Bridge, Gerbini, Adrano
Italy 1943–45
Sangro, Salerno, Volturno Crossing, Garigliano Crossing, Anzio, Advance to Florence, Gothic Line, Coriano, Lamone Crossing, Rimini Line, Argenta Gap
North-West Europe 1944-45
Odon, Caen, Bourguébus Ridge, Mont Pincon, Falaise, Nederrijn, Scheldt, Venlo Pocket, Rhineland, Rhine, Bremen

Abyssinia 1940, Greece 1941, Burma 1942

Post-war years
Korea 1951–53

Al Basrah, Iraq 2003

Colonels-Commandant
Colonels-Commandant have been:

Traditions
The official regimental motto is Fear Naught. The regimental colours are Brown, Red and Green. When it was first formed, the Tank Corps had no distinctive colours. Nothing was done about it until just before the Battle of Cambrai in 1917 when General Elles, wanting some distinguishing mark for his tank, went into a shop to buy material for a flag. Although stocks were small, the General bought some lengths of silk-brown, red and green. The silk was sewn together and was flown from his tank 'Hilda' in which he led the Tank Corps into battle. The colours typified the struggle of the Corps – 'From mud, through blood to the green fields beyond'. This most apt interpretation of the colours was suggested by Colonel Fuller. The flag is flown with the green uppermost.

Uniform
The Uniform of the Royal Tank Regiment is unique in many ways to the rest of the Royal Armoured Corps and British Army:

The black beret
Much of the uniform and equipment of soldiers during the First World War was quite impractical for use inside a tank. In particular, the vision apertures in a tank were so small that it was necessary to keep the eyes very close to them in order to get even a limited vision. Thus, any headdress with a peak was entirely unsuitable. In May 1918, General Elles and Colonel Fuller were discussing the future of the Tank Corps and its uniform and General Elles tried on a beret of the 70th Chasseurs Alpins, which was billeted nearby. A black beret was selected as it would not show oil stains. No change in uniform was possible during the war, but after a prolonged argument with the War Office, the black beret was approved by King George V on 5 March 1924. The black beret remained the exclusive headdress of the Royal Tank Corps until its practical value was recognised by others and its use extended to the majority of the Royal Armoured Corps in 1940. On the introduction of the blue beret in 1949, the Royal Tank Regiment reclaimed its right to the exclusive use of the black beret, which may not be worn by any other Regiment or Corps with the exception of the Berkshire and Westminster Dragoons Squadron of The Royal Yeomanry.

Black coveralls
The wearing of black overalls is a custom reserved to the Regiment by Material Regulations for the Army, volume 3, Pamphlet No 4 (Code 13251). It stems from the Royal Review held at Aldershot in the presence of King George V on 13 July 1935 on which occasion black overalls were worn on parade by all ranks of the Royal Tanks Corps. The practice lapsed during the Second World War, but was re-introduced in the 1950s.

Black accoutrements
Royal Tank Regiment officers and senior warrant officers also wear both a black sam browne and a black sword scabbard, while other ranks wear a black parade belt.

Sleeve badge
The sleeve badge of a First World War Mk 1 tank preceded the formation of the Royal Tank Corps when it was worn by the Heavy Branch of the Machine Gun Corps. Authorised on 7 May 1917, it is still worn today.

The ash plant
During the First World War, walking sticks were often carried by officers. Such sticks came to have a new and more important use with the introduction of tanks, which often became 'bogged' on battlefields, particularly in Flanders. Officers of the Tank Corps used these sticks to probe the ground in front of their tanks testing for firmness as they went forward. Often, the commanders led their tanks into action on foot. To commemorate this, officers of the Regiment carry ash plant sticks instead of the short cane customary to other arms.

Order of precedence

Alliances
: 12e Régiment blindé du Canada
: 1st Armoured Regiment
: Royal New Zealand Armoured Corps
: Queen Alexandra's Mounted Rifles
: 2nd Lancers (Gardner's Horse)
: 13th Lancers
: HMS Kent
: 501e Régiment de chars de combat (Bond of Friendship)

Affiliated Yeomanry
 Dorset Yeomanry
 Westminster Dragoons (2RTR)
 Royal Devon Yeomanry (2RTR)

See also

 History of the tank

Notes

Bibliography

External links

 Official website on British Army webpage
 Royal Tank Regiment Association

 
Regiments of the Royal Armoured Corps
Military units and formations established in 1917
Military units and formations of the United Kingdom in the Korean War
Armoured regiments of the British Army in World War II
Britain